The Elsieskraal River (Afrikaans Elsieskraalrivier) is a small river that flows through the Cape Town metropolitan area, in South Africa.  It rises in the Tygerberg Hills and flows in a generally south westerly direction to its confluence with the Black River just south of Pinelands. 65% of the course of the Elsieskraal River has been canalised to prevent flooding. Its catchment is part of the Central Management Area of the City of Cape Town. As most of the catchment area is urbanised and the river receives rapid runoff from roads, roofs and other impermeable surfaces it is prone to rapid increases in discharge after rain.

See also 
Salt River (river, Cape Town)
Liesbeeck River
Black River (Cape Town)
List of rivers of South Africa
List of estuaries of South Africa

References

Rivers of the Western Cape